Brassavola cucullata, common name daddy long-legs orchid, is a species of orchid native to Mexico (from Sinaloa and San Luis Potosí south to Chiapas and the Yucatán Peninsula), Belize, Central America, the West Indies and northern South America (Colombia, Venezuela, Guyana, Suriname, French Guinea).

Brassavola cucullatais the type species for the genus Brassavola, and the only member of B. sect. Brassavola.  The diploid chromosome number of B. cucullata has been determined as 2n = 40.

References

cucullata
Orchids of Belize
Orchids of Mexico
Orchids of Central America
Orchids of South America
Flora of the Caribbean
Orchids of Colombia
Orchids of Venezuela
Orchids of Suriname
Orchids of Îles des Saintes
Flora without expected TNC conservation status